The stellar atmosphere is the outer region of the volume of a star, lying above the stellar core, radiation zone and convection zone.

Overview
The stellar atmosphere is divided into several regions of distinct character:

 The photosphere, which is the atmosphere's lowest and coolest layer, is normally its only visible part. Light escaping from the surface of the star stems from this region and passes through the higher layers. The Sun's photosphere has a temperature in the 5,770 K to 5,780 K range. Starspots, cool regions of disrupted magnetic field lie on the photosphere.
 Above the photosphere lies the chromosphere. This part of the atmosphere first cools down and then starts to heat up to about 10 times the temperature of the photosphere.
 Above the chromosphere lies the transition region, where the temperature increases rapidly on a distance of only around 100 km.
 The outermost part of the stellar atmosphere is the corona, a tenuous plasma which has a temperature above one million Kelvin. While all stars on the main sequence feature transition regions and coronae, not all evolved stars do so. It seems that only some giants, and very few supergiants, possess coronae. An unresolved problem in stellar astrophysics is how the corona can be heated to such high temperatures. The answer lies in magnetic fields, but the exact mechanism remains unclear.
 Additionally, many stars have a molecular layer (MOLsphere) above the photosphere and just beyond or even within the chromosphere. The molecular layer is cool enough to contain molecules rather than plasma, and may consist of such components as carbon monoxide, water vapor, silicon monoxide, and titanium oxide.

During a total solar eclipse, the photosphere of the Sun is obscured, revealing its atmosphere's other layers. Observed during eclipse, the Sun's chromosphere appears (briefly) as a thin pinkish arc, and its corona is seen as a tufted halo. The same phenomenon in eclipsing binaries can make the chromosphere of giant stars visible.

See also
 Cecilia Payne-Gaposchkin, who first proposed the presently-accepted composition of stellar atmospheres
 Circumstellar envelope
 Heliosphere

Notes

Atmosphere